The Superior Electoral Court (TSE) is the highest body of the Brazilian Electoral Justice, which also comprises one Regional Electoral Court (TRE) in each of the 26 states and the Federal District of the country, as determined by the Article 118 of the Constitution of Brazil.

Background and legal provisions
The Brazilian Electoral Code of 1932 established the Electoral Justice in Brazil, replacing the political system conducted by the Legislative branch over the electoral proceedings. The new judicial system transferred control over such proceedings to the Judiciary. In the present, duties of the Electoral Justice are regulated by a posterior Electoral Code, approved in 1965 (Law No. 4.737/65), which revoked the 1932 code, but kept the judicial control over the electoral proceedings.

The Superior Electoral Court is the highest judicial body of the Brazilian Electoral Justice as per the §3 of the Article 121 of the Brazilian Constitution of 1988, which sets that the decisions of the TSE are unappealable, except those contrary to the Constitution, or that deny habeas corpus or writs of mandamus. Therefore, in such exceptions, the Supreme Federal Court (STF) judges appeals filed against the TSE's rulings.

The composition of the TSE is ruled by the Article 119 of the Constitution of Brazil, which sets that the court shall be composed by seven members. Three of them shall be elected by secret vote from among the Justices of the STF and two other judges shall be elected by secret vote from among the Justices of the Superior Court of Justice (STJ). The remaining two shall be appointed by the President of Brazil from among six lawyers of notable juridical knowledge and good moral reputation nominated by the STF.

Current composition

References

External links
 Official website

Judiciary of Brazil
Brazil
Brazil